Baker Lake is a lake located in Shasta County, California, United States.

References

Lakes of Shasta County, California
Lakes of California
Lakes of Northern California